Birutė Dominauskaitė (born April 16, 1973) is a former Soviet and Lithuanian female professional basketball player.

References

1973 births
Living people
Lithuanian women's basketball players
Sportspeople from Šiauliai
Soviet women's basketball players